Christian Galonnier (born 6 May 1958) is a French rugby union coach. He coached  at the 2010 Women's Rugby World Cup. He coached the French women to victory in their 2014 Women's Six Nations Championship.

References

1958 births
Living people
French rugby union coaches